Philippines–Sweden relations refers to bilateral relations between the Philippines and Sweden.

Representation
Diplomatic relations between Sweden and the Philippines were established in 1947. Sweden and the Philippines are both represented by a resident embassy.

However both embassies were closed for a certain period. Sweden closed its embassy Manila in 2008, but it was re-opened in 2016. The Philippines on their part closed its embassy in Stockholm in 2012 due to economic restraints but reopened it in 2020. During this period the Philippines has represented by a non resident ambassador in Oslo, Norway.

Filipino interests in Finland is also dealt by the Philippine embassy in Sweden.

Economic relations
In 2016, 70 delegates from 28 Swedish firms arrived in Manila to look for investments in the country. Among them were home appliance manufacturer Electrolux, Volvo, H&M and Swedish Match, which develops tobacco and light products. Sweden ranked as the Philippines' 43rd largest trading partner, with the total amount of bilateral trade reaching out more than US$143.40 million. In 2021, the Swedish multinational conglomerate, IKEA opened its largest store in Manila.

Agreements
In 2015, the two countries signed a social security agreement which coordinates the general Swedish and Philippine systems for old-age, survivors’ and disability pensions.

Migration to Sweden 
There are more than 13,000 Filipinos in Sweden most of them are overseas workers.

See also  
 Foreign relations of the Philippines 
 Foreign relations of Sweden

References 

 
Sweden
Philippines